Bencorr at , is the 82nd–highest peak in Ireland on the Arderin scale, and the 102nd–highest peak on the Vandeleur-Lynam scale. Bencorr is situated near the centre of the core massif of the Twelve Bens mountain range in the Connemara National Park in Galway, Ireland. It is the second-tallest mountain of the Twelve Bens range, after Benbaun ; it lies close to Benbaun, separated only by the third-highest mountain in the range of Bencollaghduff , and the col of Maumina.

Naming
According to Irish academic Paul Tempan, British cartographer Tim Robinson proposed the alternative name  for the mountain, however, Tempan agreed that the existing OS map name of Bencorr was the correct version.

Geography 
One of Bencorr's more distinctive features is its long rocky north-easterly spur, known as Carrot Ridge, on which sits the subsidiary peaks of Binn an tSaighdiúra  (whose prominence of only eight metres, making it an easy peak to miss), and at the far end of the spur, Bencorrbeg .

Bencorr (and Bencorr North Top) lie at the junction of two major glaciated U-shaped valleys. To the northeast is the Gleninagh Valley, meaning "Valley of Ivy", from which the Gleninagh river flows; to the west of Bencorr is the glaciated valley of the Glencoaghan River, which is bounded by several Bens.

Both corries lead down into the Derryclare Wood and Lough Inagh.

Bencorr's prominence of  qualifies it as a Marilyn, and it also ranks it as the 48th-highest mountain in Ireland on the MountainViews Online Database, 100 Highest Irish Mountains, where the minimum prominence threshold is 100 metres.

Hill walking 

The most straightforward route to climb Bencorr either via the pass of Maumina by walking up the Gleninagh valley, or by staying on higher ground by first climbing Bencorrbeg and then traversing Carrot Ridge to the summit; both routes total over 9-kilometres and 4–5 hours of walking.

A larger horseshoe-type route can be formed from an 11–14 kilometre, 5–7 hour circuit of Derryclare and Bencorr, and either descending Bencorr's small spur between its two corries, or continuing on to Bencorr North Top and descending via Carrot Ridge.

Bencorr is also climbed as part of the popular 16–kilometre, 8–9 hour Glencoaghan Horseshoe, considered one of the best ridge walks in Ireland. Bencorr is also climbed as part of the Gleninagh Horseshoe, a 15–kilometre, 8–9 hour route around the Gleninagh River usually done counter-clockwise starting at Knockpasheemore and ending at Bencorrbeg;

Rock climbing

Bencorr's northeast rocky spur, Carrot Ridge, is an important rock-climbing venue in Connemara with multi-pitch rock-climbs with grades varying from Diff (D) to Very Severe (VS), and length ranging from 150 to 320 metres. Classic climbing routes include Carrot Ridge (275m D), and Seventh Heaven (330m HS).

The large easterly corrie between the summits of Derryclare and the summit of Bencorr,  (meaning "wood of the big corrie"), also contains several large 200 metre multi-pitch graded rock climbs at grades of Diff (D) to Very Diff (VD), the most notable of which is The Knave (VD, 225 m); and the smaller corrie between the summit of Bencorr and the summit of Bencorr North Top,  (meaning "wood of the small corrie"), has a number of shorter but harder climbs including Corner Climb (VS 4c, 30 m).

Gallery

Bibliography

See also

Twelve Bens
Mweelrea, major range in Killary Harbour
Maumturks, major range in Connemara
Lists of mountains in Ireland
Lists of mountains and hills in the British Isles
List of Marilyns in the British Isles
List of Hewitt mountains in England, Wales and Ireland

References

External links
MountainViews: The Irish Mountain Website, Bencorr
MountainViews: Irish Online Mountain Database
The Database of British and Irish Hills , the largest database of British Isles mountains ("DoBIH")
Hill Bagging UK & Ireland, the searchable interface for the DoBIH

Marilyns of Ireland
Hewitts of Ireland
Mountains and hills of County Galway
Geography of County Galway
Mountains under 1000 metres
Climbing areas of Ireland